The term supermolecule (or supramolecule) was introduced by Karl Lothar Wolf et al. (Übermoleküle) in 1937 to describe hydrogen-bonded acetic acid dimers. The study of non-covalent association of complexes of molecules has since developed into the field of supramolecular chemistry. The term supermolecule is sometimes used to describe supramolecular assemblies, which are complexes of two or more molecules (often macromolecules) that are not covalently bonded. The term supermolecule is also used in biochemistry to describe complexes of biomolecules, such as peptides and oligonucleotides composed of multiple strands.

See also
Macromolecule
Molecular self-assembly
Supramolecular assembly
Supramolecular chemistry
Van der Waals molecule

References

Supramolecular chemistry